Nevada City Winery is the oldest winery in Nevada City, California, US. Located on Spring Street, its grapes are produced at one of the state's oldest vineyards. It was the first bonded winery to open in Nevada County following Prohibition in the United States. Founded in a garage as Snow Mountain Winery in 1980, it removed to the Miners Foundry Garage in 1982. The original Nevada City Winery was founded in the late 1800s on Spring Street behind the National Hotel.

Production
The original Nevada City Winery produced 5,000 cases of wines in 1885 from local grapes. In 1990, its production was estimated at 8,000 cases per year, while in 1998, its production was estimated at 9,000 cases. The winery bottles regional varietals such as syrah and zinfandel. In 1990, it was reported to bottle Chardonnay, Chenin Blanc, Gewürztraminer, Petite Sirah, Riesling, Sauvignon Blanc, Zinfandel, as well as sparkling wines. Its labels include names such as Alpenglow, Douce Noir, and Rough and Ready Red.

References

External links
 Official website

Nevada City, California
1980 establishments in California
Wineries in California